KNTS (1680 kHz) is an AM radio station broadcasting a conservative talk format. Licensed to Seattle, Washington, it serves the Seattle metropolitan area. The station is currently owned by Salem Media Group.

Former Programming
KNTS previously played regional Mexican music, cumbia, and Latino favorites like , Banda MS, Christian Nodal, La Trakalosa de Monterrey, Gerardo Ortiz, La Arrollandora Banda el Limón, Banda El Recodo, and Los Tucanes de Tijuana. The station also addresses issues affecting Latino residents in the Puget Sound, such as Immigration to the United States news, health related stories and physical fitness, depression, obesity and more; and news affecting the whole country, like COVID19 and unemployment.

Featured personalities included "Don Cheto al Aire" (Monday-Saturday, 5-10 a.m.), Jenny "La Diva" (Monday-Saturday, 10 a.m. to 3 p.m.), "El Free-Guey Show con la Bronca" (Monday-Friday, 3-7 p.m.), and "El Pájaro" Ricardo Guerrero (Monday-Friday, 7 p.m.-midnight).

History
KNTS originated as the expanded band "twin" of an existing station on the standard AM band. On March 17, 1997, the Federal Communications Commission (FCC) announced that 88 stations had been given permission to move to newly available "Expanded Band" transmitting frequencies, ranging from 1610 to 1700 kHz, with KLFE in Seattle authorized to move from 1590 to 1680 kHz.

A construction permit for the expanded band station was assigned the call letters KAZJ on January 9, 1998. The FCC's initial policy was that both the original station and its expanded band counterpart could operate simultaneously for up to five years, after which owners would have to turn in one of the two licenses, depending on whether they preferred the new assignment or elected to remain on the original frequency. However, this deadline has been extended multiple times, and both stations have remained authorized.

The station’s callsign was changed to KTFH on July 22, 2001, to KDOW on June 16, 2006, and to KNTS on July 1, 2008.

On February 11, 2021, KNTS flipped to regional Mexican as "La Patrona 1680".

On August 5, 2022, it was announced that Salem will sell the station to Baaz Broadcasting. The FCC has generally required paired original and expanded band stations to remain under common ownership. However, it was also proposed to sell KNTS's standard band companion, KLFE on AM 1590, to a different company, Reliant Radio, so a waiver request was filed with the FCC to allow an exception to the common ownership requirement. This request listed as one justification the fact that this waiver would support FCC efforts to increase minority radio stations holdings, as Baaz "was 100% controlled by individuals of South Asian descent". In addition, the $225,000 sales price was said to be less than half of KNTS's fair market value, as established by independent appraisal.

On March 1, 2023, KNTS dropped the Regional Mexican format and began simulcasting sister station KKOL, which airs a conservative talk format.

References

External links

NTS
Radio stations established in 1998
Salem Media Group properties
1998 establishments in Washington (state)
Talk radio stations in the United States
Conservative talk radio